The 2014 Nordic Folkboat Gold Cup was held in Kerteminde, Denmark between July 29 and August 2, 2014. The hosting yacht club was Kerteminde Sejlklub.

Results

References

International sports competitions hosted by Denmark
Sailing competitions in Denmark
2014 in sailing
2014 in Danish sport